West District Hockey currently runs 3 men's outdoor divisions and 2 men's indoor divisions. The leagues are run by the West District committee. The season runs from September to April, with indoor running from December to February. The winner of division 1 is declared the West District Champion!

Current Teams

There are currently 34 teams from 16 different clubs that compete in the West District.

West District Division 1
Clydesdale 3
Dumfries
Glasgow High Kelvinside
Glasgow University 3
Helensburgh
Hillhead 3
Kelburne 3
Rottenrow Bluesox
Western 3
Uddingston 3

West District Division 2
Anchor
Ayr
Clydesdale 4
Giffnock
Hillhead 4
Rottenrow Bluesox 2
Stepps 2
Strathclyde University 2
Uddingston 4
Western 4

West District Division 3
Ayr 2
Clydesdale Development
Dumfries 2
Helensburgh 2
Hillhead 5
Kelburne 4
Uddingston 5

West District Division 4
Clydesdale 5
Giffnock 2
Greenock Morton 2
Helensburgh 3
Hillhead 6
Hillhead 7
Western 5

Past winners
The current champions are Hillhead Hockey Clubs 3rd XI, last contested in the 2018-19 season. The 2019-20 season was three quarters finished before it was cancelled due to the COVID-19 pandemic. The leaders were Uddingston Hockey Clubs 3rd XI, however no award was given. The 2020-21 season was also cancelled due to the pandemic. Western Hockey Club have won the most league titles with 23. A total of nine different clubs have won the competition.

Other divisions
There have been as many as 6 divisions in the west district however in recent years it has alternated between 3 and 4. Currently there are 3 other divisions below division 1.

Past winners

References

Field hockey competitions in Scotland